The West Indies National Party was a political party in Saint Vincent and the Grenadines. It contested the 1974 general elections, but received just 116 votes and failed to win a seat. It did not contest any further elections.

References

Political parties in Saint Vincent and the Grenadines